Acacia pycnostachya, also known as Bolivia wattle, is a shrub or tree belonging to the genus Acacia and the subgenus Juliflorae that is native to eastern Australia.

Description
Like most species of Acacia it has phyllodes rather than true leaves. It blooms between August and October producing golden flowers. The pods are wrinkled longitudinally with pale coloured margins.

Distribution
It is endemic to the north eastern corner of New South Wales in the Bolivia Range in the northern tablelands on the border with Queensland where it is found on granite slopes amongst boulders growing in sandy soil as a part of dry heath and Eucalyptus and Callitris woodland communities.

See also
List of Acacia species

References

pycnostachya
Flora of New South Wales
Taxa named by George Bentham
Taxa named by Ferdinand von Mueller
Plants described in 1864